Cwmcarn High School was a school in the village of Cwmcarn, in South East Wales. The school (for school years 7–11) also had a sixth form where pupils could return to continue their education in a familiar environment. The students and people in the area always praised Cwmcarn High, and many protests took place to attempt to keep the school open.

There were prior to the closure of the school short of 400 students attending CHS including the 6th form. This represented a considerable decrease in numbers since 2012. The school was closed for over a year over asbestos fears in 2012 which was why there had been such a fall in the school roll. Due to this and the ever falling school roll, it was confirmed by Caerphilly County Borough Council that the school will close in 2018.

The recently appointed executive headteacher had to draw up plans with other senior leaders for the schools closure. The headteacher is also Executive head of Newbridge School, also in Caerphilly, and has been for many years.

Cwmcarn High served an area of established housing within a former mining village, but it also had drawn pupils from further afield such as from the nearby city of Newport. Following the reorganisation of the schools status in September 1999, the school became a foundation school. A sixth form was established in 1997 with 1700 students and recently before closure served 150+.

Approximately 98% of the pupils came from local primary schools. The remainder came from schools beyond the immediate neighbourhood. Almost all of the pupils came from semi-rural areas similar to the village that serves the school.

The school officially closed in July 2018. The school will be demolished to build a new building for the nearby Welsh School Ysgol Gymraeg Cwm Gwyddon.

References

Cwmcarn High School at cwmcarnhigh.co.uk

Secondary schools in Caerphilly County Borough